Grøningen is a lake in the municipality of Snåsa in Trøndelag county, Norway.

See also
List of lakes in Norway

References

Snåsa
Lakes of Trøndelag